The 2016 Australian Open wildcard playoffs and entries was a group of events and internal selections to choose the eight men and eight women singles wildcard entries for the 2016 Australian Open, as well as seven male and seven female doubles teams plus eight mixed doubles teams.

One wildcard each was given to the winners of the Australian Open Wildcard Playoff, a tournament between Australian players who did not receive direct entry into the draw. This took place from 14 to 20 December 2015.

In an agreement with the United States Tennis Association and the French Tennis Federation, Tennis Australia gives one man and one woman from the United States and France each a wildcard into the Australian Open. The French players were chosen by internal selection, while USTA awarded the entry to the player with the most points over three pre-selected events in USA over October and November 2015.

Since the Australian Open is promoted as the "Grand Slam of Asia/Pacific", one male and one female player from this geographical area were awarded a wildcard. This was decided through the Asia-Pacific Australian Open Wildcard Playoff. At the same event, one male and one female doubles team won wildcards, and one wildcard each was contested in boys and girls singles. This took place from 2 to 6 December 2015.

Remaining wildcards were awarded by internal Australian selection.

For the first time, a new initiative was put in place for rewarding women's wildcards. A wildcard race was put in place by Tennis Australia to offer the highest Australian points earner from the 2015 Canberra Tennis International and 2015 Bendigo Women's International a main draw wildcard. The singles wildcard was won by Tammi Patterson and the doubles wildcard was won by Jessica Moore and Storm Sanders. Also for the first time, the winner of the girls' 18 and under national championships was rewarded a main draw wildcard.

Wildcard entries

Men's singles

Women's singles

Men's doubles

Women's doubles

Mixed doubles

Asia-Pacific Wildcard Playoff
The Asia-Pacific Wildcard Playoff events took place in Shenzhen, Guangdong, China from Monday, November 30 to Sunday, December 6, 2015. A total of 26 male and 30 female players from Asia/Pacific zone took part in singles events (including qualifying competitions), with Yoshihito Nishioka from Japan and Han Xinyun from China gaining the Australian Open entry. Both doubles events consisted of 18 male and 19 female teams, with Hsieh Cheng-peng & Yang Tsung-hua and Shuko Aoyama & Makoto Ninomiya winning the wild cards. Junior playoff events were also held, and Chinese players Mu Tao and Wang Xiyu won the wild card entries into the Boys' and Girls' main events, respectively.

Men's singles

Women's singles

Men's doubles

Women's doubles

Australian Wildcard Playoff
The December Showdown was held between 5 and 20 December. This Showdown included the Wildcard Playoff as well as 18/u, 16/u, 14/u and 12/u National Championships. The men's wildcard playoff was won by top seed James Duckworth who defeated Benjamin Mitchell in the final by a walkover. Mitchell was forced to pull out of the final to be in Brisbane with his partner whom was due to give birth. The women's wildcard playoff was won by unseeded teen Maddison Inglis, who defeated newlywed Arina Rodionova in the final.

Men's singles

Women's singles

NB: Kimberly Birrell was the number 5 seed, but withdrew prior to the commencement of play.

Girls' singles
For the first time in Australian Open history, the winner of the girls' 18/U Championships will receive a main draw wildcard into the 2016 Australian Open. The wildcard was won by top seed Priscilla Hon who defeated wildcard playoff winner Maddison Inglis in the final.

NB: Kimberly Birrell was the number 2 seed.

Mixed doubles
The 'Win a Wildcard' competition held by Tennis Australia allowed any person over the age of 16 entry into the competition. State championships were held across the period of November and December and the finals were held at Melbourne Park on 20 December. The entire competition was played using the Fast4 Tennis method. The competition was won by Bradley Mousley and Jessica Moore who had secured a wildcard into the 2016 Australian Open mixed doubles event. However, Mousley withdrew from the event, and Moore partnered Marc Polmans.

References

External links
 Asia Pacific Men's Singles draw
 Asia Pacific Women's Singles draw
 Asia Pacific Men's Doubles draw
 Asia Pacific Women's Doubles draw
 18/u Girls' Singles National Championships draw
 Men's Singles wildcard playoff draw
 Women's Singles wildcard playoff draw
 Mixed Doubles wildcard playoff draw